Late Edition or Late Editions may mean:

 Late Edition with Wolf Blitzer, broadcast on CNN from 1993 to 2009
 BBC4's The Late Edition (2005–08)
 "Late Editions" episode 9, season 5 of The Wire
 The late edition of a newspaper, see Newspaper#Zoned_and_other_editions
 Late-night news broadcasts in general